Dzifa is a given name. It may refer to:

Given name
Dzifa Affainie (born 1980), Ghanaian television presenter and anchor
Dzifa Attivor (1956–2021), Ghanaian politician and businesswoman
Dzifa Bampoh, Ghanaian journalist, communications and media personality
Dzifa Gomashie, Ghanaian actress, producer, screen scriptwriter and politician and government minister

Middle name
Esther Dzifa Ofori, Ghanaian diplomat